Javel–André Citroën is a station of the Paris Métro, serving line 10 and offering transfer to the RER C via Javel RER station in the 15th arrondissement. West of this station, line 10 splits into separate eastbound and westbound sections until Boulogne–Jean Jaurès (although both lines pass through Mirabeau, it is only served by eastbound trains; the point where the lines actually diverge is located west of that station).

History
The station opened as Javel on 30 September 1913 as part of the extension of line 8 from Beaugrenelle (now Charles Michels) to Porte d'Auteuil. It was then named after the nearby district of Javel, then known for its production of bleach, known as eau de Javel in French. In 1785, Claude Louis Berthollet had discovered the active ingredient in household bleach, sodium hypochlorite, and in 1789 built a bleach factory in there.

On 27 July 1937, the section of line 8 between La Motte-Picquet–Grenelle and Porte d'Auteuil, including Javel was, transferred to line 10 during the reconfiguration of lines 8, 10, and the old line 14. On 8 June 1959, the station was renamed Javel–André Citroën, a year after the renaming of quai de Javel to quai André-Citroën, after André Citroën (1878-1935), a pioneer in automobile construction  and founder of the automobile industrial empire Citroën in 1919.

Until the 2000s, an exhibition was set up on the platforms to commemorate the life and business dealings of André Citroën through posters and photographs placed on the walls. This was, however, removed as part of the "Renouveau du métro" programme by the RATP. Since June 2018, an exhibition dedicated to Citroën was installed, including a timeline retracing its history and touch screens allowing travelers to access its website directly on the platforms.

In 2019, the station was used by 2,969,444 passengers, making it the 177th busiest of the Métro network out of 302 stations.

In 2020, the station was used by 1,331,833 passengers amidst the COVID-19 pandemic, making it the 194th busiest of the Métro network out of 305 stations.

In 2021, the station was used by 1,589,561 passengers, making it the 222nd busiest of the Métro network out of 305 stations.

Passenger services

Access 
The station has 3 accesses on either side of avenue Émile-Zola:

 Access 1: quai André-Citroën (with a rare Val d'Osne totem)
 Access 2: rue de la Convention
 Access 3: avenue Émile-Zola (with an escalator)

Station layout

Platforms 
The station has a standard configuration with 2 tracks surrounded by 2 side platforms.

Other connections 
The station is also served by the RER C line across the road at Javel station as well as lines 30, 62, and 88 of the RATP bus network.

Nearby 
 Église Saint-Christophe-de-Javel
 Front de Seine
 Jardin des Cévennes
 Jardin des Mères-et-Grands-Mères-de-la-Place-de-Mai
 Parc André Citroën
 Piscine Keller
 Pont Mirabeau
 Port of Javel-Bas
 square Paul-Gilot

Gallery

References

Roland, Gérard (2003). Stations de métro. D’Abbesses à Wagram. Éditions Bonneton.

Paris Métro stations in the 15th arrondissement of Paris
Railway stations in France opened in 1913